The War of the Catalans or Particular War of Catalonia (Catalan: Guerra dels Catalans or Guerra Particular de Catalunya) was one of the last military campaigns of the War of the Spanish Succession, which affected the Principality of Catalonia. This last phase of the conflict began when, despite the armistice signed between Philip V and Charles VI of Austria that put an end to the war from July 1, 1713, the Three Commons of Catalonia —the most prominent Catalan political institutions: the Generalitat, the Military Arm of Catalonia and the Consell de Cent of Barcelona— unilateraly proclaimed on 9 July 1713 the continuation of the war against Philip V and France, thus prolonging the war until 12 September 1714.

On March 14, 1713, during the negotiations for the Peace of Utrecht, Charles of Austria resignated to the facts and signed the "Armistice Agreement and Evacuation of Catalonia", while asking the British that the Principality of Catalonia was established as an independent republic, or that if it remained under the rule of Philip V it would preserve the Catalan constitutions. But after the resignation of Philip V to the throne of France, the delivery of Gibraltar and the Balearic island of Menorca, and several commercial concessions in America, the British yielded to Philip V who they recognized as the legitimate Spanish monarch, granting amnesty to the Catalans and the same rights and privileges as the inhabitants of the Crown of Castile, meaning de de facto abolition of the laws of Catalonia.

Charles of Austria notified the evacuation of the Habsburg troops to the members of the Generalitat, concluding that continuing the war would only cause useless bloodbath which would have no more result for Catalonia than its total and absolute destruction, in the face of which he induced them to accept the "General Pardon to the Catalans" promulgated by Philip V. A few days later the empress left Barcelona and on June 22, 1713, the representatives of Philip and Charles signed the "Hospitalet Convention", which ended the War of Succession in Spanish territory without guarantee the maintenance of the Constitutions of Catalonia. But a radical faction of the Catalan aristocracy forced the members of the Generalitat to convene a Junta de Braços which, after slow discussions on July 9, 1713 and with the support of the Popular Estate, unilaterally proclaimed the continuation of the war in the name of the king "for the conservation of the Liberties, Privileges and Prerogatives of the Catalans, which our predecessors obtained at the expense of gloriously shedding blood and we must, likewise, maintain, which have not been taken into consideration Utrecht, nor in l'Hospitalet."

From the Bourbon point of view, the war of succession had ended, so that the Three Commons of Catalonia committed the crimes of rebellion and lèse majeste against their legitimate monarch, who did not recognize the Three Commons as a contending power, nor as a valid interlocutor of Charles of Austria with whom he had signed an armistice. On the contrary, the Three Commons proclaimed that the war was not over and that they were acting under the protection of their legitimate monarch -Charles of Austria-, who, they believed, in view of their determination to fight, would not be long in coming to save Catalonia.

Initially reduced to Barcelona, a governing council was set up which, faced with the evacuation of the Habsburg army, raised an army of its own - the Army of Catalonia - appointing Antoni de Villarroel as commander general. On July 25, 1713, the Bourbon armies arrived in front of Barcelona but, unable to take it, blocked it on the ground hoping to suffocate it. But within the city, the division between radicals and moderates - even the Head Councilor of Barcelona Manuel Flix i Ferreró was in favor of the submission negotiated with Philip V - harmed the initiatives of the first months of the war. The moderates attempted a diplomatic operation in collusion with the Catalan ambassador in London Pau Ignasi Dalmases to surrender Catalonia to Philip V in a negotiated manner, but in November 1713 the election of the new Head Councilor Rafael Casanova frustrated the plan.

References

Military history of Catalonia
War of the Spanish Succession
Principality of Catalonia
Early Modern Catalonia
1713 in Europe
1714 in Europe
Conflicts in 1713
Conflicts in 1714